Swim Deep are a British indie pop band formed in Birmingham, England. The band currently consists of Austin Williams (vocals), Cavan McCarthy (bass), James Balmont (keyboards), Robbie Wood (guitar), and Thomas Fiquet (drums).

Swim Deep were formed in 2011 by Williams, Higgins, and Wolfgang J. Harte. Harte left the band in late 2012 and was replaced by Cavan McCarthy. James Balmont joined the band as a live member in 2013 and became a full member the next year. In 2018, it was confirmed Zachary Robinson (drums) and Tom Higgins (guitar) had left the band ahead of recording their third album. Thomas Fiquet (drums) and Robbie Wood (guitar) joined the band for the recording of their third album, 'Emerald Classics'. Swim Deep have been identified as part of the emerging Digbeth-based B-Town scene.

In late 2012, in Brussels, the band began to record what would later become their debut album, Where the Heaven Are We. Where the Heaven Are We was released on 5 August 2013. The band released their second album, Mothers, on 2 October 2015. After a line-up change, they released their third album, Emerald Classics, on 4 October 2019.

History

2010-2012: Formation and record deal 
Swim Deep was formed in 2010 by Austin Williams, Tom Higgins, and Wolfgang J. Harte. The band went through multiple drummers until they eventually recruited Zachary Robinson, who, at the time, was playing in a band called Cajole Cajole. On the subject, Austin said, "We thought it was a long shot but we’d just lost another drummer so we asked Zach if he wanted to join our band, that was one of the best things that happened, to be honest." After a few months, Harte announced that he was leaving the band. The band played as a three piece until they recruited Cavan McCarthy, a merchandise seller from a fellow Birmingham band, Peace. The band released two demos, "Isla Vista" and "Santa Maria," on SoundCloud in 2011.

In 2012, Swim Deep signed with Chess Club/RCA and released their debut single, "King City," in May 2012. After a UK tour with Spector in November and December 2012, the band went to Brussels to record their debut album with producer Charlie Hugall. They released their second single, "Honey," in November. NME's review of "Honey" said that "the best bits of the Birmingham mob’s latest cut have the pull of a star-spangled whirlpool that’ll suck you back into the late ’80s."

2013: Where the Heaven Are We 

The band accompanied Two Door Cinema Club during their early 2013 UK tour. On 3 February 2013, a video was released for their next single, "The Sea". The single was released the month after on 7" vinyl and download, backed with a cover of "Down by the Seaside". On 10 May 2013, they released their fourth single, "She Changes the Weather", along with an EP of the same name.

On 29 July 2013, Swim Deep's debut album, Where the Heaven Are We, was released. Where The Heaven Are We received mainly positive reviews, with a Metacritic score of 72. NME and The Guardian both rated the album three out of five stars. The Guardian's Michael Hann commented that "Where the Heaven Are We is a pleasant wander through the byways of early-90s indie styles that doesn't ever really assert itself terribly strongly".  NME's Barry Nicolson said, "the dreamy, detached sneer of the vocals, the lolloping XXL basslines, all that unwashed hair… Some scenes come roaring out of the traps; B-Town seemed to roll out of bed, insular and uncontrived, smirking at its own in-jokes".

2014-2017: Mothers 
Following tours throughout 2013 to support their debut album, the band began recording their second album in London in September 2014. In December, they returned to Brussels to continue their progress. They finished recording in January 2015. They released "To My Brother", the first single from the second record, in February. "To My Brother" was noted by critics for its marked change in direction, with many picking up on the unexpected influence of acid house music. Speaking to DIY Magazine, Austin addressed the band's dramatic new direction: "I feel like we’re all shaving our heads and going to war with this record." The second single from the album, "One Great Song and I Could Change the World", was released in April 2015.

In June 2015, the band announced Mothers, their sophomore album, would be released 19 September, but later was delayed until 2 October 2015. Mothers, heavily influenced by acid house and techno, received positive reviews from critics, with a Metacritic score of 79. NME's Rhian Daly described "Namaste" as "a great big bolt of pop that’s impossible to ignore". DIY Magazine's Stephen Ackroyd said that "Fueiho Boogie" "explodes time and time again into increasingly more ridiculous krautrock techno extravaganzas." In December 2015, Swim Deep toured North America with The 1975.

2018-2019: Emerald Classics 
Swim Deep confirmed they were recording their third album in Margate in June 2018 titled, Emerald Classics, in reference of a pub in Birmingham called The Emerald. The band later announced the departures of long-serving members Zachary Robinson and Tom Higgins in a statement. Captioning a photograph of a new-look Swim Deep on the beach, they said: "We’re off to a studio by the sea to finally finish the album we’ve been dreaming of our whole lives and we’re so ready to share it with you." 

They played their first show of the year in Jakarta, Indonesia in September 2018, performing two new songs titled "To Feel Good" and "Sail Away, Say Goodbye". The songs were later included in their third album. They performed their first gig in the UK at Dalston venue Birthdays on 12 September 2018, and later headlined Academy 2 Manchester as part of Neighbourhood Festival. Both UK comeback shows were well-received. The band played their first hometown show in Birmingham for three years on 4 November, playing an in-store show at the Dr Martens store in Birmingham's Bullring shopping centre. In February 2019, they performed a sold-out show at Guildford Boileroom for Independent Venue Week. 

The band returned with new single "To Feel Good" in May 2019. They then performed three shows in Birmingham at The Sunflower Lounge as part of a residency in June 2019. On 4 October 2019, they released their third album, Emerald Classics. It was followed by a UK headline tour and a series of shows in Thailand and mainland China.

2020-present: Familiarise Yourself with Your Closest Exit EP 
On 5 November 2021, Swim Deep released "On the Floor" which featured singer Phoebe Green. It is the lead single off their collaborative EP, Familiarise Yourself with Your Closest Exit. It was released on 11 March 2022. The EP contains five tracks that featured other artists, Australian singer-songwriter Hatchie and Thai pop duo Dept, as well as Williams' fiancée, Nell Power. Written during lockdown, Williams described the EP as "shoegazey, but like The 1975 [rather than] a '90s throwback".

On 1 September 2022, the band announced a UK headline tour, alongside the release of a stand-alone single, "Little Blue".

Musical style
The band's musical style has been described as "melodic, guitar-based rock that belies the influence of '80s dream pop and '90s shoegaze." The band's debut album featured an indie pop sound, with influences from bands such as Ride and the Stone Roses, as well as from baggy, trip hop and new wave genres. Nevertheless, the band transitioned to a psychedelic pop sound on their second album, Mothers, informed by acid house, Balearic beat, gospel music and Motorik rhythms.

Members

Current 
Austin Williams - vocals, guitar, sitar, keyboards, synthesizer, organ, piano, xylophone, percussion (2010–present)
Cavan McCarthy - bass guitar, keyboard, synthesizer, backing vocals (2012–present)
James Balmont - keyboards, synthesizer, keytar, piano, percussion, backing vocals (touring member 2013-2014, full member 2014–present)
Robbie Wood - guitar, keyboard, backing vocals (2018–present)
Thomas "Tomaski" Fiquet - drums, backing vocals (2018–present)

Former 
 James "Wolfgang" Harte - bass guitar, backing vocals (2010–2012)
 Tom Higgins - guitar, keyboard, synthesizer, backing vocals (2010–2018)
 Zachary Robinson - drums, percussion, keyboard, synthesizer, backing vocals (2011–2018)
 Johnny Aries - keyboards (2013) (touring member)

Discography

Albums

EPs

Singles

References

External links

British indie rock groups
Musical groups established in 2011
Psychedelic pop music groups
British indie pop groups
RCA Records artists
2011 establishments in England